is a Japanese organizational theorist and management consultant, known for his work on quality management, specifically on Kaizen.

Life and work 
Born in Tokyo, Imai obtained his BA from Tokyo University in 1955, where he continued to do graduate work in international relations.

Late-1950s Imai worked for five years in Washington DC at the Japanese Productivity Center, where he was responsible to accompany groups of Japanese businessmen on visits to American plants. In 1962 in Tokyo he founded his own Employment agency  for the recruitment of management, executive and research personnel.

In 1986 he founded the Kaizen Institute Consulting Group (KICG) to help western companies to introduce the concepts, systems and tools of Kaizen. In the same year he published, in Japan, the book on business management "Kaizen: Japanese spirit of improvement", which helped popularizing the Kaizen concept in the West.<ref>Mark Graban, Joseph E. Swartz (2012) Healthcare Kaizen: Engaging Front-Line Staff in Sustainable Continuous Improvements. p. 42</ref>

 Work 
 Kaizen 
Kaizen, Japanese for "improvement" or "change for the best", refers to philosophy or practices that focus upon continuous improvement of processes in manufacturing, engineering, and business management. It has been applied in healthcare, psychotherapy, life-coaching, government, banking, and other industries. Imai (1986) acknowledged that Kaizen starts with detection of needs and problem definition:The starting point for improvement is to recognize the need. This comes from recognition of a problem. If no problem is recognized, there is no recognition of the need for improvement. Complacency is the archenemy of KAIZEN.Ishikawa (1985) and Imai (1986) both defined the Seven Basic Tools of Quality. Looking back on the impact of Kaizen, Imai (1997) stated:   'Kaizen' means ongoing improvement involving everybody, without spending much money. When 'Kaizen' was first published here in 1986, many U.S. products were of poor quality, and Japanese-made products were gaining market share. Since then, American companies have made great strides in improving product quality, and much of that is attributable to their implementation of kaizen principles, which incorporate TQM.Selected publications
 Imai, Masaaki. Kaizen: The key to Japan's competitive success. New York, itd: McGraw-Hill (1986).
 Imai, Masaaki (1997-03-01). Gemba Kaizen: A Commonsense, Low-Cost Approach to Management'' (1e. ed.). McGraw-Hill

References 

1930 births
Living people
Japanese business theorists
Japanese management consultants
University of Tokyo alumni
People from Tokyo